The OCEAN2020 initiative, signed in late March 2018, is a large-scale technology demonstration project funded by the European Union's Preparatory Action on Defence Research and implemented by the European Defence Agency.

Funded by the European Union's Preparatory Action on Defence Research and implemented by the European Defence Agency, the project aims at building up a Recognised Maritime Picture to secure maritime dominance, through the integration of data from multiple sources and unmanned systems in existing fleets.

With a 35 million budget, the 3-year project is aimed to solve the problems of integrating EU systems as well as integrating the individual organizations into a team. From an operational perspective, this initiative will bring significant improvement to maritime Situation Awareness, with extended surveillance performance by using unmanned platforms integrated with Combat Management Systems.

The Consortium 
The team involving 42 entities, from enterprises to startups, is drawn from 15 countries across Europe with end users of some European Navies such as Italian, Lithuanian Navy, Portuguese, Hellenic and Spanish MoD.

Main Activities 
The project will follow standard proven processes and will facilitate user involvement during the whole project cycle, from definition to demonstration and assessment. This approach is essential to align the objectives and scope of OCEAN2020 with the EU Members Navies vision and cover, validation of potential technologies for future certifications, standardization and procurement strategies.

Live Demos 
OCEAN2020 project will involve two live demonstrations of maritime surveillance and interdiction operations, conducted by European fleets using unmanned aircraft, surface vessels and underwater systems.

References

External links 
 

European Union
Technology demonstrations